David França Oliveira e Silva (born 29 May 1982), simply known as David, is a Brazilian footballer who last played as a defensive midfielder for América Mineiro.

Honours
Náutico
Campeonato Pernambucano: 2001

Fluminense
Copa do Brasil: 2007

Goiás
Campeonato Goiano: 2012, 2013
Campeonato Brasileiro Série B: 2012

América Mineiro
Campeonato Brasileiro Série B: 2017

External links

1982 births
Living people
Brazilian footballers
Association football midfielders
Campeonato Brasileiro Série A players
Campeonato Brasileiro Série B players
Club Athletico Paranaense players
Clube Náutico Capibaribe players
Marília Atlético Clube players
Fluminense FC players
Grêmio Barueri Futebol players
Vila Nova Futebol Clube players
Goiás Esporte Clube players
Santa Cruz Futebol Clube players
América Futebol Clube (MG) players
Yverdon-Sport FC players
Pogoń Szczecin players
Brazilian expatriate footballers
Brazilian expatriate sportspeople in Switzerland
Brazilian expatriate sportspeople in Poland
Expatriate footballers in Switzerland
Expatriate footballers in Poland